Haal-E-Kangaal (Hindi: हाल ए कंगाल, English: The Bankrupts) is a minimalist Hindi language feature film. The film is shot in a single location – a suburban flat in the city of Mumbai. The film stars only two actors.  Ramchandra PN served as both the writer and director. The film is a black comedy that is a humorous account of the artistic and intellectual bankruptcy of independent filmmaking scene that presently exists in India. In a larger context, the film subtly debates the role of a filmmaker / artist in a highly competitive self centric world.

Plot 

Two struggling filmmakers meet after a gap of fifteen years and have to spend a few hours together. As one of them narrates a script of a film to the another over liberal doses of drinks, the past catches up with them and for the two friends the celebration soon turns into a secession of one up-man-ship where accusations flow freely – the question of success, of failures and of a subtle comparison of individual achievements arise. The duo by the end of the film realise that they are as bankrupt as ever – literally, and in all sense of the word.

Premier 
A rough cut was shown in 2014 at the Manipal International Film Festival. The group Popup talkies has been taking the film as a part of its curated package on Indian art house movies to places like Hyderabad and Mumbai.

Haal-E-Kangaal has its premier on the 10th of June 2018 at the Reaktor Indian Film Festival in Vienna, Austria as a part of a package of Indian Art House film curated by programme coordinator Vivek Singhania and Festival director Bernhard Kammel.

Cast 
Niraj Sah as Tripurari Gupta (Trips)
Hemant Mahaur as Lokesh Sharma.

References

External links 
 
 Director Interview
Review

2014 films
Films directed by Ramchandra P. N.